Avianca Flight 011, registration HK-2910X, was a Boeing 747-200B on an international scheduled passenger flight from Frankfurt to Bogotá via Paris, Madrid, and Caracas that crashed near Madrid on 27 November 1983. It took off from Charles de Gaulle Airport in Paris at 22:25 on 26 November 1983 for Madrid Barajas Airport; take-off was delayed waiting for additional passengers from a Lufthansa flight due to a cancellation of the Paris-Frankfurt-Paris segment by Avianca for operational reasons.

The 11 surviving passengers were seriously injured. The cause of the accident was judged to be pilot error, the captain having incorrectly determined the position of the plane. As of 2022, Avianca Flight 011 remains the second-deadliest aviation accident in Spanish territory behind the Tenerife airport disaster, the deadliest accident in mainland Spain, and the deadliest accident in the history of Avianca.

Aircraft and crew 
The aircraft was a Boeing 747-200 that first flew in 1977 and was delivered to Scandinavian Airlines System the same year. The aircraft was registered as LN-RNA and was named Magnus Viking. It was leased to Avianca in 1982 and re-registered as HK-2910X and renamed Olafo. The aircraft was powered by four Pratt & Whitney JT9D-70A turbofan engines and was 6.3 years old at the time of the accident.

The captain was 58-year-old Tulio Hernández, who was one of Avianca's most experienced pilots, having been with the airline for 32 years. He had logged a total of 23,215 flight hours, including 2,432 hours on the Boeing 747.

The first officer was 36-year-old Eduardo Ramírez, who had been with the airline for 10 years and had 4,384 flight hours, with 875 of them on the Boeing 747.

The flight engineer was 57-year-old Juan Laverde, another one of Avianca's veteran pilots, who had been with the airline for 25 years and had 15,942 flight hours. He was the most experienced on the Boeing 747, having logged 3,676 hours on it. There were also two relief flight engineers on board: Daniel Zota and Julio Florez Camacho.

Accident
About 20 minutes prior to the impact, the aircraft had obtained meteorological information on the weather conditions at Barajas from Avianca. The first contact with Spanish air traffic controllers had taken place at 23:31. At 00:03 the aircraft contacted Barajas again, and was cleared to land on runway 33; this was the air traffic controller's last contact with the aircraft. The time of the accident was approximately 00:06 on 27 November. The plane hit three different hills on its way down during the crash, with the third hill being the final impact. The debris of the airplane was widely scattered as a consequence of the impacts. The crash killed 158 passengers, 19 crew members, and four off-duty crew members. Miraculously, 11 passengers (6 women and 5 men) survived, but were seriously injured. Of the injured, nine were ejected from the airplane, a few of them still in their seats, and two claimed to have exited the aircraft by themselves. The aircraft was completely destroyed by the impact and ensuing fire. The airplane was equipped with a digital flight data recorder and a cockpit voice recorder, both of which were recovered on the day of the accident in good condition.

Investigation
The crash was investigated by the Spanish Civil Aviation Accident and Incident Investigation Commission (CIAIAC). 

There was no evidence of any anomalies in Paris prior to this flight. The crew had stayed in the city 72 hours after arriving on flight AV010 on the first day, 24 November 1983. The investigation also determined that the pilot-in-command and crew were properly licensed and qualified, as were the air traffic controllers. The aircraft carried a valid certificate of airworthiness, as well as a registration and maintenance certificate. The airplane was maintained in accordance with the prescribed maintenance program, and the navigation and approach aids were checked and found to be functioning correctly. In addition, there was no record of malfunctions in the controllers' communications or radar equipment, and no evidence was discovered of defects in the aircraft engines or systems.

Flight Number 
As of 2022, Avianca still operates Flight 011, a daily non-stop flight from Madrid to Bogota, using a Boeing 787 Dreamliner.

Notable people killed
 Jorge Ibargüengoitia – Mexican novelist
 Ángel Rama – Uruguayan writer, academic, and literary critic
 Rosa Sabater – Spanish pianist
 Manuel Scorza – Peruvian novelist, poet, and political activist
 Marta Traba – Argentine writer and art critic

See also

 Japan Airlines Flight 123
 Korean Air Flight 801
 American Airlines Flight 965
 Air Inter Flight 148
 List of accidents and incidents involving commercial aircraft
 Prinair Flight 277

Notes

References

External links

Civil Aviation Accident and Incident Investigation Commission
 Report from the Ministry of Infrastructures, Spain .
 Transcript of the cockpit voice recorder (CVR) 
 

Airliner accidents and incidents caused by pilot error
Airliner accidents and incidents involving controlled flight into terrain
Aviation accidents and incidents in 1983
History of Madrid
Aviation accidents and incidents in Spain
Accidents and incidents involving the Boeing 747
Avianca accidents and incidents
1983 in Spain
Adolfo Suárez Madrid–Barajas Airport
1980s in Madrid
November 1983 events in Europe
Aviation accidents and incidents caused by air traffic controller error